Pashupati Area Development Trust (PADT; Nepali: पशुपति क्षेत्र विकास कोष) is a trust established to conserve and operate the Pashupatinath Temple and other charitable institution in the Pashupatinath UNESCO World Heritage Sites area.

The trust is operated under the Pashupati Area Development Trust Act, 1987. The trust operates regular worshipping activities. This organization also conducts Hindu Funerals and has Funeral support centers, and old-age home.

References

External links
 Official Website of Pashupati Area Development Trust

Charities based in Nepal
Hindu_organizations
1987 establishments in Nepal